Logan Township is a township in Winnebago County, Iowa, in the USA.

History
Logan Township was founded in 1881.

References

Townships in Winnebago County, Iowa
Townships in Iowa